The grizzled giant squirrel (Ratufa macroura) is a large tree squirrel in the genus Ratufa found in the highlands of the Central and Uva provinces of Sri Lanka, and in patches of riparian forest along the Kaveri River and in the hill forests of Karnataka, Tamil Nadu and Kerala states of southern India. The International Union for Conservation of Nature (IUCN) lists the species as near threatened due to habitat loss and hunting.

Etymology and common names
Grizzled giant squirrels are named for the white flecks of hair that cover their greyish-brown bodies, giving them a grizzled look.

Description

It has small rounded ears with pointed tufts.

Subspecies dandolena is dorsally brown grizzled with white. Ventrally light brownish cream. Tail frosted with white fur. Forehead and feet are black in color. Whereas ssp. melamochra, upper parts are jet black which contrast brownish cream to orange yellow ventral surface. Tail frosted with black fur. Snout of both ssp. are pinkish color.

Their vision is good, which aids them in detecting predators. Their sense of hearing is relatively poor. The call is staccato and loud with repeated shrill cackle. It is usually uttered in morning and evening. A low "churr" is also used to communicate with nearby groups.

Hands are normally pentadactylous, with four digits and a rudimentary thumb. Fingers have large broad soft pads, where the inner pad is expanded for gripping while moving through branches. Feet are also comprised with soft pads with both fore and hind limbs possessing long, sharp claws.

Distribution

In India, R. macroura has been recorded from Grizzled Squirrel Wildlife Sanctuary, Theni Forest Division, Palni Hills, Chinnar Wildlife Sanctuary, Anaimalai Tiger reserve, Sirumalai, Thiruvannamalai Forest Division of the Eastern Ghats, Hosur Forest Division and Cauvery Wildlife Sanctuary. The easternmost population of Ratufa macroura dandolena was discovered in the Pakkamalai Reserve Forest in eastern Tamil Nadu.

Grizzled Squirrel Wildlife Sanctuary is located in Shenbagathoppu, Srivilliputtur, Tamil Nadu, India.

Diet
Ratufa macroura are known to eat fruits, nuts, insects, bird eggs, and the bark of some trees. The fruit of the climber Combretum ovalifolium is an especially important food source where it occurs. Young squirrels, upon first emerging from the nest, have been observed to feed exclusively on this fruit.

Behavior
Unlike its relatives, the giant squirrel balances using its two hind feet, instead of its tail.

The species is almost entirely an arboreal, very rarely coming to the ground to escape from predators, to flee from an intruder, attack males of the territory, and connecting with females.

Subspecies
The three subspecies are easily recognizable due to color distinctions. They are also geographically separated demes. The table below lists the three recognized subspecies of Ratufa macroura, along with any synonyms associated with each subspecies:

According to Mammals of Sri Lanka, the three subspecies are identified as follows:

 Ratufa macroura macroura
Males are 35 cm long and females with 37 cm. Tail is 37 cm long in males and 38 cm in females. Jet black dorsal area with a sheen. Rump with white grizzling appearance. Underparts brownish creamy to pale yellow. Tail is with dark black fur with white tip. Face has pink color in naked areas. Fur moderately long with few coarse hairs. Geographically, this subspecies is restricted to central highlands up to 2000m, such as Horton Plains.

 Ratufa macroura dandolena
Males are 37 cm long and females 35 cm. Tail varies from 37 cm in males and 40 cm in females. Males are larger than females. Dorsal surface is brown instead of jet black in subsp. macroura. White rump. Distinct maroon tinge between shoulders. There is a brownish cream crown patch. Underparts are light brownish cream. Tail is dark brown and there is a reddish-brown tip. Fleshy parts of face are pink. Fur moderately long and coarse. Inhabit dry zone parts of the island, as well as India.

 Ratufa macroura melanochra
Males are 35 cm long and females 37 cm. Tail varies from 37 cm in males and 38 cm in females. Upperparts are jet black with contrasting color variation with creamy yellowish ventral surface. Fur is shorter and coarser. Found in low country wet zone, and intermediate zones of the country.

References

External links

ARKive - images and movies of the grizzled giant squirrel (Ratufa macroura)

Animal Diversity Web
Hybridisation

Ratufa
Mammals of Asia
Rodents of India
Mammals described in 1769
Taxa named by Thomas Pennant